Johann "Hans" Fraberger (March 23, 1905 – 1948) was an Austrian boxer who competed in the 1928 Summer Olympics.

He was born in Vienna.

In 1928 he was eliminated in the first round of the welterweight class after losing his fight to the upcoming bronze medalist Raymond Smillie.

External links
profile

1905 births
1948 deaths
Sportspeople from Vienna
Welterweight boxers
Olympic boxers of Austria
Boxers at the 1928 Summer Olympics
Austrian male boxers